Eucelatoria bryani is a species in the family Tachinidae ("bristle flies"), in the order Diptera ("flies").

Distribution
El Salvador, Honduras, Mexico, Nicaragua, United States.

References

Exoristinae
Insects described in 1981
Taxa named by Curtis Williams Sabrosky
Diptera of North America